People's Union of Kazakhstan Unity was a big tent political party in Kazakhstan founded in 1993 and dissolved in 1999 when it was incorporated into the Fatherland and later the Nur Otan party.

Notable members
 Akezhan Kazhegeldin (Prime Minister of Kazakhstan 1994–1997)
 Nurlan Balgimbayev (Prime Minister of Kazakhstan 1997–1999)

Election results

Presidential Elections

Mazhilis

References

Defunct political parties in Kazakhstan